The following radio stations broadcast on FM frequency 107.0 MHz:

Belgium
 Radio Contact in Eupen

China 
 CNR The Voice of China in Kunming

Indonesia
 Be 107 FM in Batam and Singapore

Malaysia
 Suria in Seremban, Negeri Sembilan

United Kingdom
 107 Meridian FM in East Grinstead
 Sunshine Radio in Monmouth
 Q Radio in County Antrim
 Greatest Hits Radio South in Reading

References

Lists of radio stations by frequency